In Brazil, a Legislative Assembly is the state-level legislature. All legislative assemblies are unicameral, with elected members who are designated as State Deputies, and who serve four-year terms.

In the Federal District, which is not a state, the analogue is the Legislative Chamber of the Federal District, with elected members designated as district deputies. Its name represents a mixture of legislative assembly (legislative body of the other units of the federation) and municipal chamber (legislative body of the municipalities).

State legislatures and legislative chamber

 
Brazil politics-related lists